Joe Critchlow (born July 4, 1944) is a former Canadian football player who played for the Montreal Alouettes and Winnipeg Blue Bombers of the Canadian Football League. He was one of 11 All Division players on the 1972 Blue Bombers and was on the 1974 Grey Cup champion Alouettes team.  He played college football at Southeast Missouri State University.

References

1944 births
Living people
Montreal Alouettes players
Players of American football from Missouri
People from Sikeston, Missouri
Southeast Missouri State Redhawks football players
Winnipeg Blue Bombers players
San Antonio Wings players
Canadian football defensive linemen